Jeff Vermeulen (born 7 October 1988 in Zwolle) is a Dutch former professional racing cyclist.

Major results

2004
 1st  Sprint, National Novice Track Championships
2005
 1st  Individual pursuit, National Junior Track Championships
2006
 2nd Madison, National Track Championships (with Pim Ligthart)
2007
 National Track Championships
1st  Derny
2nd Points race
2nd Scratch
3rd Madison (with Pim Ligthart)
 1st Omloop van de Hoekse Waard
 1st UIV Cup Munich, U23
2008
 3rd Points race, National Track Championships
2009
 National Track Championships
2nd Individual pursuit
2nd Madison (with Pim Ligthart)
 8th Ronde van Midden-Nederland
 10th Antwerpse Havenpijl
2012
 1st Stage 3 Olympia's Tour
 1st Stage 1 Course de la Solidarité Olympique
 2nd Ronde van Noord-Holland
2013
 1st Zuid Oost Drenthe Classic I
 Olympia's Tour
1st  Points classification
1st Stages 1 & 3
 1st Mountains classification Tour du Loir-et-Cher
 4th Ster van Zwolle
 4th Ronde van Overijssel
2015
 1st Zuid Oost Drenthe Classic I
 1st Ronde van Overijssel
 1st Parel van de Veluwe
 Olympia's Tour
1st Stages 1a (TTT) & 4
 1st Stage 2 Paris–Arras Tour
 7th Ster van Zwolle
 8th Overall Dookoła Mazowsza
2016
 1st Ster van Zwolle
 1st Stage 5 Tour du Loir-et-Cher

External links

1988 births
Living people
Dutch male cyclists
Dutch track cyclists
Sportspeople from Zwolle
Cyclists from Overijssel
20th-century Dutch people
21st-century Dutch people